No. 520 Squadron RAF was a meteorological squadron of the Royal Air Force during the Second World War.

History
The squadron was formed at RAF Gibraltar on 20 September 1943 from 1403 Flight. Equipped with Lockheed Hudsons, it was tasked with collecting meteorological data from both the Mediterranean and Atlantic. In February 1944 it was re-equipped with Handley Page Halifaxes and these were supplemented by Supermarine Spitfires, although the Spitfires were replaced with Hawker Hurricanes a few months later. In September 1944 the squadron absorbed 1500 (BAT) Flight and its Miles Martinets, which were used for target towing. The squadron also operated the Hudson again and also the Vickers Warwick. The squadron continued to serve for a while after the war was over, and was even given an air-sea rescue task, using the Warwicks, but was disbanded at Gibraltar on 25 April 1946.

Aircraft operated

Squadron bases

See also
List of Royal Air Force aircraft squadrons

References

Notes

Bibliography

External links

 Squadron histories for nos. 500–520 sqn

Aircraft squadrons of the Royal Air Force in World War II
520
Military weather units and formations
Military units and formations established in 1943